Bernardino de Anaya came to Peru in the middle of the 16th century and founded the city of Chachapoyas, Peru. Alderete Maldonado of Anaya, more known as the Admiral, settled down in Cusco and at present his house is a museum called The house of the Admiral. Also, Anaya was entrusted to kill the last Inca in Vilcabamba, but had no success, so they killed it.

References

16th-century Spanish people
People from Amazonas Region
Spanish city founders